A rapparee was Irish guerrilla fighters in the 1690s, and a name given to bandits and highwaymen in Ireland.

Rapparee may also refer to:

Rapparee Cove, a cove near the town of Ilfracombe, north Devon, England
 HSC FastCat Ryde, a high speed catamaran ferry renamed Rapparee 
 The Rapparee, an 1870 play presented at Niblo's Garden